Saint Candida (Spanish:Santa Cándida) is a 1945 Argentine comedy film directed by Luis César Amadori and starring Niní Marshall, Francisco Álvarez and Nelly Darén. The film's title is a reference to Candida the Elder. Delfy de Ortega won the Silver Condor Award for Best New Actress for her performance.

Cast
 Niní Marshall as Cándida
 Nelly Darén
 Francisco Álvarez
 Semillita
 Delfy de Ortega
 Adolfo Linvel
 Pura Díaz
 Tita Perly
 Carmen Giménez
 Aída Fernández
 Maruca Montejo
 Blanca Vidal
 María de la Fuente
 Margarita Burke 
 Adrián Cúneo
 Carlos Lagrotta
 Federico Mansilla
 Rufino Córdoba
 César Fiaschi
 Ernesto Villegas
 Francisco Barletta
 Marcelle Marcel
 Warly Ceriani
 Pura Díaz
 Fausto Padín
 Walter Jacob
 Aída Fernández
 José Rivas
 Fernando Campos

References

Bibliography 
 Abel Posadas, Mónica Landro & Marta Speroni. Cine sonoro argentino: 1933-1943. El Calafate Editores, 2005.

External links 

1945 films
Argentine comedy films
1945 comedy films
1940s Spanish-language films
Films directed by Luis César Amadori
Argentine black-and-white films
1940s Argentine films